Youngblood is an album by the jazz drummer Elvin Jones, recorded in 1992 and released on the Enja label.

Production
Trumpet player Nicholas Payton was just 19 years old during the recording sessions. The album was engineered by Rudy Van Gelder.

Critical reception

The Philadelphia Inquirer, noting Jones's younger players, wrote: "If there were ever an argument for melding the wisdom of age with the impetuousness of youth, this is it." The Gazette praised Joshua Redman, concluding: "In a remarkable solo turn on 'Angel Eyes', he wanders through the history of jazz both ancient and recent—and better yet, sounds quite at home in the present."

The AllMusic review noted the "consistently inspired playing from all of the musicians... An excellent effort".

Track listing
 "Not Yet" (Javon Jackson) - 3:55 
 "Have You Seen Elveen?" (Nicholas Payton) - 7:43 
 "Angel Eyes" (Earl Brent, Matt Dennis) - 8:47 
 "Ding-A-Ling-A-Ding" (Elvin Jones) - 7:20 
 "Lady Luck" (Jones, Frank Wess) - 9:30 
 "The Biscuit Man" (Donald Brown) - 4:00 
 "Body and Soul" (Edward Heyman, Robert Sour, Frank Eyton, Johnny Green) - 6:15 
 "Strange" (George Mraz) - 4:15 
 "My Romance" (Lorenz Hart, Richard Rodgers) - 6:16 
 "Youngblood" (Jones) - 5:51

Personnel
Elvin Jones  - drums 
Nicholas Payton - trumpet
Javon Jackson, Joshua Redman - tenor saxophone
George Mraz - double bass

References

Elvin Jones albums
1992 albums
Enja Records albums
Albums recorded at Van Gelder Studio